is a professional Japanese baseball player. He last played catcher for the Chunichi Dragons.

External links
 NPB.com

1991 births
Living people
People from Asahi, Chiba
Japanese baseball players
Nippon Professional Baseball catchers
Chunichi Dragons players
Baseball people from Chiba Prefecture